The Drino or Drinos is a river in southern Albania and northwestern Greece, tributary of the Vjosë. Its source is in the northwestern part of the Ioannina regional unit, near the village Delvinaki. It flows initially southwest, then northwest and crosses the Albanian border near Ktismata. It continues northwest through Gjirokastër and flows into the Vjosë near Tepelenë.

Name

The Albanian name of the river is Drino and the Greek name is Δρίνος, Drinos. The name of the river contains the root Drin-, which is considered to be of Illyrian origin and is encountered also in the northern Albanian river Drin (cf. also Drina between Bosnia and Herzegovina and Serbia).

References

Rivers of Albania
Rivers of Greece
International rivers of Europe
Landforms of Ioannina (regional unit)
Rivers of Epirus (region)
Geography of Gjirokastër County
Pindus
Braided rivers in Albania